Hubert-Félix Thiéfaine is a French pop-rock singer and songwriter. He was born on 21 July 1948 in the town of Dole in the Jura département.

Mostly shunned by television and radio, he has built over the years – through word of mouth and frequent touring – a considerable following which allowed him to fill the 17,000-seater Palais omnisports de Paris-Bercy for an anniversary concert in 1998. In recent years he has been increasingly name-dropped as an influence by the latest generation of performers in France, and was the subject of a tribute album of covers in 2002. He has been performing since the late 1960s and releasing records since 1978.

Musically, Thiéfaine draws mostly from classic rock, with rare nods to the latest musical trends, and generally leaves the arranging to a collaborator. His songs are most notable for instantly recognisable lyrics, with their trademark streams of consciousness, surreal and often extreme or dark imagery, often tinged with comedy, cynicism, literary references, neologisms and liberal use of scientific, long or foreign words. The lyrical mayhem sometimes spreads into comically long song titles, such as Enfermé dans les cabinets (avec la fille mineure des 80 chasseurs), or Exercice de simple provocation avec 33 fois le mot "coupable".  His education in a Catholic boarding school has also left deep traces which surface in his lyrics in the form of biblical quotations and cheerfully blasphemous lyrics.

His avowed influences include Léo Ferré, Lou Reed, Bob Dylan, Jim Morrison and many French, Anglophone and German novelists and poets, with a preference for romantic literature.

Discography

Albums
Studio albums
1978 – Tout corps vivant branché sur le secteur étant appelé à s'émouvoir
1979 – Autorisation de délirer
1980 – De l'amour, de l'art ou du cochon
1981 – Dernières balises (avant mutation)
1982 – Soleil cherche futur
1984 – Alambic/sortie-sud
1986 – Météo für nada
1988 – Eros über alles
1990 – Chroniques bluesymentales
1993 – Fragments d'hébétude

Live albums
1983: En concert (double album vinyl or double CD)
1986: En concert vol. 2 (double album vinyl or double CD)
1988: Routes 88 (double album vinyl or simple CD)
1995: Paris-Zénith (double CD)

Compilations
1988: 1978–1983 
1989: 1984–1988
1998: 1978–1998
2002: Les fils du coupeur de joints (homage & compilation)
2006: Les Indispensables – compilation
2009: Séquelles (Peaked in SNEP France #58 and BEL (Wallonia) #56)

Singles

Videos
 1992 : Bluesymental tour (VHS)
 1995 : Paris-Zénith (VHS)
 1999 : En concert à Bercy (DVD)
 2007 : Scandale mélancolique tour (DVD)

References

External links

 Official site

1948 births
Living people
People from Dole, Jura
French male singers
French singer-songwriters
French-language singers
Commandeurs of the Ordre des Arts et des Lettres
French male singer-songwriters